StorTrends is a brand name of disk-based, hybrid array, and solid state storage products for computer data storage in data centers, sold by AmZetta Technologies. Formally a division of American Megatrends, StorTrends appliances utilize the iTX architecture, which includes features such as deduplication and compression, SSD caching and SSD tiering, automated tiered storage, replication, data archiving, snapshots, WAN optimization, and a VMware vSphere plug-in.

History 
StorTrends started in 2004 as the storage area network (SAN) and network-attached storage (NAS) product division of American Megatrends. In 2011, StorTrends released the 3400i dual controller SAN unit. In January 2014, it released the 3500i SSD hybrid SAN array as the first hybrid system with tandem SSD Caching and SSD Tiering. Similar to the 3400i, the 3500i received third-party validation from analysts at the Taneja Group, among others. In March 2015, StorTrends released the 3600i and 3610i All Flash SAN models with inline compression and deduplication technology support with a starting price tag of $24,999. In July 2015, StorTrends won a Most Valuable Product (MVP) award from Computer Technology Review for the 3600i All Flash SAN. In Q1 2017, StorTrends released the 2610i All Flash Array - a 2U, 24-bay system designed for high performance workloads and I/O-intensive environments. In April, 2019, StorTrends became a division of AmZetta Technologies.

Products 

StorTrends units are shipped with SSDs, spinning HDDs, or a mixture of the two known as an SSD Hybrid Array. The StorTrends 3400i is a spinning-disk SAN with expansion capabilities up to 256TB. The StorTrends 3500i is an SSD hybrid SAN that offers both SSD caching and SSD tiering in the same appliance in order to preserve flash performance for both frequently accessed data and random IO. The 3600i is an All Flash SAN with a specified Read Tier and Write Tier to increase the lifespan of the flash drives. The StorTrends 2610i is the latest generation All Flash Array with deduplication, compression, and dedicated Hot and Cold Tiers to deliver sustained high performance in a dense 2U, 24-bay system. The StorTrends appliances range from 2TB to 256TB of raw storage capacity. Its SAN products utilize the iSCSI protocol and support 1GbE and 10GbE connectivity with multiple teaming options. The StorTrends models and specifications are shown below:

Architecture 
StorTrends iTX architecture is an enterprise class feature set founded on 50 storage-based patents with over 70 additional patents pending. All of the StorTrends appliances are shipped pre-installed with the StorTrends iTX architecture. StorTrends iTX features include:                                                                                                      
 deduplication and compression
 Enlift caching algorithm (write IO and drive endurance optimization)
 SSD caching and SSD tiering
 snap-assisted replication
 automated data tiering
 thin, exact and auto provisioning
 redirect-on-write snapshots
 VMware plug-in for vSphere
 SAN (block) and NAS (file) support
 advanced snapshots (SnapTrends)
 replication (disaster recovery)
 wide-area data services (WDS)
 data archiving (data deduplication)
 GUI web-based management
 ManageTrends
 storage resource management charts

Support 
StorTrends support, known as StorAID, is a 24x7 support service offering warranty, maintenance and alert monitoring of the StorTrends appliances. StorAID is offered in 1 year, 3 year and 5 year terms with one year renewal options. StorAid is offered standard with NBD (Next Business Day) onsite hardware replacement. StorAID support is conducted by members of the StorTrends Support Team from Norcross, Georgia. StorTrends is VMware, Microsoft and Citrix certified.

VMware Support:           
 TAP Elite Partner, VAAI Support, vSphere Client Plug-in
 VMware ESX 3.5, vSphere 4.0, 4.1, 5.0, 5.1, 5.5, and 6.0+ HCL

Microsoft Support:              
 Hyper-V Support and Microsoft Gold Partner
Citrix Support:           
 Citrix Ready

Customers 
StorTrends claims thousands of customer installs in varying verticals, including: education, legal services, retail, engineering, government, manufacturing, and healthcare. StorTrends maintains international branch offices and channel partners that serve a worldwide market in varying degrees and capacities. In March 2014, StorTrends was awarded a 5-star rating in CRN's 2014 Partner Program Guide.
StorTrends units have been deployed for virtualization, high performance applications/databases (high IOPS), VDI, disaster recovery, archival and cloud storage solutions.

References 

Companies based in Gwinnett County, Georgia
Electronics companies established in 2004
Computer storage companies
Manufacturing companies based in Georgia (U.S. state)